Korshevo is a rural locality (a selo) and the administrative center of Korshevskoye Rural Settlement, Bobrovsky District, Voronezh Oblast, Russia. The population was 2,004 as of 2010. There are 16 streets.

Geography 
Korshevo is located 17 km northeast of Bobrov (the district's administrative centre) by road. Shishovka is the nearest rural locality.

References 

Rural localities in Bobrovsky District
Bobrovsky Uyezd